Mammillaria dixanthocentron is a species of cactus in the subfamily Cactoideae.

References

Plants described in 1963
dixanthocentron